Nitya Krishinda Maheswari Korwa (born 16 December 1988) is an Indonesian former badminton player affiliated with Jaya Raya Jakarta, specializing in doubles event. She won the women's doubles gold medals at the 2011 Southeast Asian Games and at the 2014 Asian Games.

Career 
Maheswari participated at the 2009 World Championships, where she reached rank 9 in the women's doubles together with Greysia Polii. In 2011, she won the gold medal at the Southeast Asian Games with Anneke Feinya Agustin. She also won the women's doubles gold medal at the 2014 Asian Games with Polii.

She won her first Superseries title paired with Greysia Polii at 2015 Korea Open.

In 2016, she and her partner Greysia Polii were qualified for the BWF Superseries Finals. However, they withdrew from the tournament due to Maheswari's scheduled knee surgery, and their position was replaced by Vivian Hoo and Woon Khe Wei.

Personal life 
Maheswari was born to a Papuan father and a Javanese mother. Her father Panus Korwa is a former national footballer who has notably played for Arema Malang. Her cousin Lisa Rumbewas was a famous weightlifter and two-time Olympic silver medalist. Her uncle Levi, Lisa's father, was a bodybuilder.

Achievements

BWF World Championships 
Women's doubles

Asian Games 
Women's doubles

Asian Championships 
Women's doubles

Southeast Asian Games 
Women's doubles

World Junior Championships 
Girls' doubles

Asian Junior Championships 
Girls' doubles

BWF Superseries (2 titles, 3 runners-up) 
The BWF Superseries, which was launched on 14 December 2006 and implemented in 2007, was a series of elite badminton tournaments, sanctioned by the Badminton World Federation (BWF). BWF Superseries levels were Superseries and Superseries Premier. A season of Superseries consisted of twelve tournaments around the world that had been introduced since 2011. Successful players were invited to the Superseries Finals, which were held at the end of each year.

Women's doubles

  BWF Superseries Finals tournament
  BWF Superseries Premier tournament
  BWF Superseries tournament

BWF Grand Prix (4 titles, 2 runners-up) 
The BWF Grand Prix had two levels, the Grand Prix and Grand Prix Gold. It was a series of badminton tournaments sanctioned by the Badminton World Federation (BWF) and played between 2007 and 2017.

Women's doubles

Mixed doubles

  BWF Grand Prix Gold tournament
  BWF Grand Prix tournament

BWF International Challenge/Series/Satellite (3 titles, 2 runners-up) 
Women's doubles

Performance timeline

National team 
 Junior level

 Senior level

Individual competitions 
 Junior level

 Senior level

Record against selected opponents 
Women's doubles results against World Superseries finalists, World Superseries Finals semifinalists, World Championships semifinalists, and Olympic quarterfinalists paired with:

Greysia Polii 

  Bao Yixin & Chen Qingchen 0–1
  Bao Yixin & Cheng Shu 0–1
  Bao Yixin & Tang Jinhua 0–5
  Cheng Shu & Zhao Yunlei 1–2
  Luo Ying & Luo Yu 4–2
  Tang Jinhua & Tian Qing 0–2
  Tang Yuanting & Ma Jin 1–2
  Tang Yuanting & Yu Yang (F) 2–5
  Tian Qing & Zhao Yunlei 2–4
  Wang Xiaoli & Ma Jin 0–3
  Yu Yang (F) & Du Jing 0–2
  Yu Yang (F) & Wang Xiaoli 3–3
  Yu Yang (F) & Zhong Qianxin 1–0
  Zhao Tingting & Zhang Yawen 0–2
  Chien Yu-chin & Cheng Wen-hsing 0–1
  Christinna Pedersen & Kamilla Rytter Juhl 5–2
  Kamilla Rytter Juhl & Lena Frier Kristiansen 2–1
  Jwala Gutta & Ashwini Ponnappa 2–1
  Misaki Matsutomo & Ayaka Takahashi 2–3
  Miyuki Maeda & Satoko Suetsuna 2–1
  Naoko Fukuman & Kurumi Yonao 5–1
  Reika Kakiiwa & Miyuki Maeda 2–3
  Shizuka Matsuo & Mami Naito 6–0
  Chang Ye-na & Lee So-hee 3–1
  Jung Kyung-eun & Kim Ha-na 1–0
  Jung Kyung-eun & Shin Seung-chan 1–1
  Lee So-hee & Shin Seung-chan 2–0
  Chin Eei Hui & Wong Pei Tty 1–1
  Shinta Mulia Sari & Yao Lei 3–0
  Kunchala Voravichitchaikul & Duanganong Aroonkesorn 2–0

Anneke Feinya Agustin 

  Bao Yixin & Zhong Qianxin 0–3
  Luo Ying & Luo Yu 0–1
  Tang Jinhua & Xia Huan 0–1
  Yu Yang (F) & Wang Xiaoli 0–2
  Zhao Yunlei & Tian Qing 0–2
  Chien Yu-chin & Cheng Wen-hsing 1–0
  Christinna Pedersen & Kamilla Rytter Juhl 1–0
  Tse Ying Suet & Poon Lok Yan 0–1
  Nadya Melati & Vita Marissa 1–0
  Jwala Gutta & Ashwini Ponnappa 0–1
  Misaki Matsutomo & Ayaka Takahashi 0–1
  Miyuki Maeda & Satoko Suetsuna 0–3
  Mizuki Fujii & Reika Kakiiwa 0–3
  Eom Hye-won & Chang Ye-na 1–0
  Ha Jung-eun & Kim Min-jung 1–0
  Jung Kyung-eun & Kim Ha-na 1–2
  Lee So-hee & Shin Seung-chan 1–0
  Shinta Mulia Sari & Yao Lei 3–1

References

External links 

 
 BWF World Ranking

1988 births
Living people
People from Blitar
Sportspeople from East Java
Javanese people
Papuan people
Indonesian Hindus
Indonesian female badminton players
Badminton players at the 2016 Summer Olympics
Olympic badminton players of Indonesia
Badminton players at the 2010 Asian Games
Badminton players at the 2014 Asian Games
Asian Games gold medalists for Indonesia
Asian Games bronze medalists for Indonesia
Asian Games medalists in badminton
Medalists at the 2010 Asian Games
Medalists at the 2014 Asian Games
Competitors at the 2009 Southeast Asian Games
Competitors at the 2011 Southeast Asian Games
Competitors at the 2013 Southeast Asian Games
Southeast Asian Games gold medalists for Indonesia
Southeast Asian Games silver medalists for Indonesia
Southeast Asian Games medalists in badminton
Universiade bronze medalists for Indonesia
Universiade medalists in badminton
Medalists at the 2007 Summer Universiade
Badminton coaches